Kettle Creek is a  tributary of the Little River in Wilkes County, Georgia, in the United States.  It is part of the Savannah River watershed.

The Battle of Kettle Creek, an important battle in the American Revolutionary War, took place at this site.

References

See also
List of rivers of Georgia (U.S. state)

Rivers of Wilkes County, Georgia
Rivers of Georgia (U.S. state)